is a prolific Japanese music video director. Takeishi has created videos for Japanese superstars such as Ayumi Hamasaki and Every Little Thing.

Most Expensive Music Videos 
Three videos that Takeishi directed appear on the list of most expensive music videos. He directed three out of five for Ayumi Hamasaki, excluding Green and Virgin Road.

The videos are:
My Name's Women - Ayumi Hamasaki - Cost: $1,200,000
Fairyland - Ayumi Hamasaki - Cost: $2,000,000
Jewel - Ayumi Hamasaki - Cost: $1,000,000

Directorial Trademarks 

Takeishi's most pervasive interest is one in bright reflective light by way of lens flares, white lights, reflective back grounds/surfaces/microphones, back lighting, moving lights on the video's subject. Often this creates high contrast between light and shadow. Morning Musume's "Osaka Koi no Uta" and "Ambitious! Yashinteki de li jan" offer good examples:the former contains shots of sparkling jewelry, members of the band sing into a sequined microphone, and bright pulsating and moving lights during dance segments. The latter's lighting is at a constant flicker, the set is reflective metallic sheets behind disco balls and spinning lights affixed to the floor. In "Ambitious!" lens flares and reflections are a constant.

Takeishi also employs camera focus often in the aforementioned "Osaka Koi no Uta" many of the shots are in partial focus. However Every Little Thing's "Shapes of Love" provides a more indicative example, shots are often sliding in and out of focus or remaining unfocused. Yaen's "Get Down" goes as far as to encompass everything thus far being home to rapid flashing lights, partial focus, and a blur that slides in and out.

Too are the rapid fire transitions that appeared in "Shapes of Love" they appear in "Dakishimeru" by BoA, an already fast paced video is punctuated by quick successions of different shots sometimes inexplicably detached from the beat. In a similar vein "Future World" again by Every Little Thing Takeishi instead speeds up segments of the same shot to get a similar effect to the rapid transition, in some shots these are over-laid with rapid images.

Music Videos 

Sorted by year, then within year sorted alphabetically.

References 

1982 births
Living people
Japanese music video directors